Hajjiabad castle is a historical castle located in Hajjiabad County in Hormozgan Province, The longevity of this fortress dates back to the Ilkhanate, Timurid Empire and Safavid Empire.

References 

Castles in Iran